Wien Erzherzog-Karl-Straße is a railway station serving Donaustadt, the twenty-second district of Vienna. It has an island platform on each line, although at present no passenger trains use the Laaer Ostbahn north of the station.

Services 
 the following services stop at Wien Erzherzog-Karl-Straße:

References

External links 
 
 

Railway stations in Vienna
Austrian Federal Railways